Iranian Australians or Persian Australians are Australian citizens who are of Iranian ancestry or who hold Iranian citizenship.

Terminology 
Iranian-Australian is used interchangeably with Persian-Australian, partly due to the fact that, in the Western world, Iran was known as "Persia". On the Nowruz of 1935, Reza Shah Pahlavi asked foreign delegates to use the term Iran, the endonym of the country used since the Sasanian Empire, in formal correspondence. Since then the use of the word "Iran" has become more common in the Western countries. This also changed the usage of the terms for Iranian nationality, and the common adjective for citizens of Iran changed from "Persian" to "Iranian". In 1959, the government of Mohammad Reza Shah Pahlavi, Reza Shah Pahlavi's son, announced that both "Persia" and "Iran" could officially be used interchangeably. However the issue is still debated today.

History

The first known Iranian immigrant to Australia was Hamed Mortis who was naturalised in New South Wales (NSW) on 20 October 1883. The only other early Iranian immigrant to NSW was Mohamad Ameen Khan who was naturalised on 29 June 1899.

Few Iranians migrated to Victoria in the nineteenth century, with only seven recorded in the 1891 census. From 1950 to 1977, the first wave of immigration from Iran to Australia occurred, but it was relatively insignificant in terms of the number of immigrants. Annually, few thousand tourists entered Australia which only a few hundreds were immigrants during this period, mostly university students who decided to stay. The vast majority of Iran's emigrants left their homeland just after the 1979 Islamic revolution which was the end of 2500 years of monarchy. For the period 1978–1980, the average number of Iranians entering Australia as immigrants annually increased to more than 5,000. From the period 1980–1988, there was a strong trend of emigration to Australia. Since 2000, there has been a wave of Iranian migration to Australia, especially engineers and doctors, through skilled migration program.

Iranians speak Persian and also Azerbaijani Turkish, Kurdish, and some other Persian languages and dialects are spoken in different regions of Iran. They practice the Iranian culture, which includes Nowruz. Along religious lines, both Muslim and non-Muslim Iranians reside in Australia. Non-Muslim Iranians include Iranian Christians mainly Armenian and Assyrian, Iranian Baháʼís, Iranian Mandaeans, Iranian Jews and Iranian Zoroastrians. The Bureau of Statistics reports that at the 2011 census the major religious affiliations amongst Iran-born were Islam (12 686) and Baháʼí (6269). Of the Iran-born, 18.4 per cent stated 'No Religion', which was lower than that of the total Australian population (22.3 per cent), and 9.4 per cent did not state a religion.

Several sources have noted estimates of Iranian diaspora mainly left Iran since the 1979 revolution, a significant number of which currently reside in the United States and Western Europe while the community in Australia is very small. The Iranian-Australian community, in line with similar trends in Iran and other countries around the world, has produced a sizeable number of individuals notable in many fields, including Law, Medicine, Engineering, Business and Fine Arts.

Iranian Australian census
In 1991, the ABS figures revealed an Iranian population of 12,914. In 2004, 18,798 people in Australia claim to be of Iranian ancestry.

Notable people

 Soheil Abedian, founder and CEO of Sunland Group
 Arman Abrahimzadeh, domestic violence campaigner
 Shervin Adeli, futsal player
 Hoda Afshar, artist
 Alireza Ahmadian, businessman
 Mojean Aria, actor
 Daniel Arzani, footballer
 Sam Bashiry, entrepreneur
 Donya Dadrasan, singer
 Sam Dastyari, senator for NSW
 Michael Denkha, actor
 Nabil Elderkin (mother is Iranian), film and music video director
 Kamran Eshraghian, engineer
 Alireza Faghani, football referee
 Amir Farid, pianist
 Salme Geransar, actress
 Zarah Ghahramani, writer
 Anise K, songwriter
 Shokufeh Kavani, painter
 Beejan Land, actor
 Joey Mead King, model, VJ, and TV and events host (Iranian biological father)
 Abbas Mehran, artist
 Ashkan Mokhtarian, MMA fighter
 Suman Mokhtarian, MMA fighter
 Granaz Moussavi, poet, film maker
 Anoushiravan Nourian, boxer
 Rita Panahi, opinion columnist
 Nabi Saleh, founder of Gloria Jean's Coffees
 Agnes Sarkis, mezzo soprano
 Hassan Shahsavan, Greco-Roman wrestler
 Farzad Tarash, Freestyle wrestler
 Hossein Valamanesh, artist
 Kia Zand, artist
 Ali Pahlavan, pop singer

See also

 Iranian peoples
 Persian people
 2,500 year celebration of the Persian Empire
 Shirazi wine
 Iranian diaspora
 Turkish Australians
 Armenian Australians
 Assyrian Australians
 Iranian New Zealanders
 Mandaean Australians

References

 
Ethnic groups in Australia
Iranian Australian